Events in the year 2003 in Japan.

Incumbents
 Emperor: Akihito
 Prime Minister: Junichiro Koizumi (L–Kanagawa)
 Chief Cabinet Secretary: Yasuo Fukuda (L–Gunma)
 Chief Justice of the Supreme Court: Akira Machida
 President of the House of Representatives: Tamisuke Watanuki (L–Toyama) until October 10, Yōhei Kōno (L–Kanagawa) from November 19
 President of the House of Councillors: Hiroyuki Kurata (L–Chiba)
 Diet sessions: 156th (regular, January 20 to July 28), 157th (extraordinary, September 26 to October 10), 158th (special, November 21)

Governors
Aichi Prefecture: Masaaki Kanda 
Akita Prefecture: Sukeshiro Terata 
Aomori Prefecture: Morio Kimura (until 1 July); Shingo Mimura (starting 1 July)
Chiba Prefecture: Akiko Dōmoto 
Ehime Prefecture: Moriyuki Kato 
Fukui Prefecture: Yukio Kurita (until 22 April); Issei Nishikawa (starting 23 April)
Fukuoka Prefecture: Wataru Asō 
Fukushima Prefecture: Eisaku Satō
Gifu Prefecture: Taku Kajiwara 
Gunma Prefecture: Hiroyuki Kodera 
Hiroshima Prefecture: Yūzan Fujita 
Hokkaido: Tatsuya Hori (until 22 April); Harumi Takahashi (starting 23 April)
Hyogo Prefecture: Toshizō Ido
Ibaraki Prefecture: Masaru Hashimoto 
Ishikawa Prefecture: Masanori Tanimoto
Iwate Prefecture: Hiroya Masuda 
Kagawa Prefecture: Takeki Manabe 
Kagoshima Prefecture: Tatsurō Suga 
Kanagawa Prefecture: Hiroshi Okazaki (until 22 April); Shigefumi Matsuzawa (starting 23 April)
Kochi Prefecture: Daijiro Hashimoto 
Kumamoto Prefecture: Yoshiko Shiotani 
Kyoto Prefecture: Keiji Yamada 
Mie Prefecture: Masayasu Kitagawa (until 21 April) Akihiko Noro (starting 21 April)
Miyagi Prefecture: Shirō Asano 
Miyazaki Prefecture: Suketaka Matsukata (until 4 August); Tadahiro Ando (starting 5 August)
Nagano Prefecture: Yasuo Tanaka 
Nagasaki Prefecture: Genjirō Kaneko 
Nara Prefecture: Yoshiya Kakimoto
Niigata Prefecture: Ikuo Hirayama 
Oita Prefecture: Morihiko Hiramatsu (until 27 April); Katsusada Hirose (starting 28 April)
Okayama Prefecture: Masahiro Ishii 
Okinawa Prefecture: Keiichi Inamine
Osaka Prefecture: Fusae Ōta 
Saga Prefecture: Isamu Imoto (until 22 April); Yasushi Furukawa (starting 23 April)
Saitama Prefecture: 
 until 18 July: Yoshihiko Tsuchiya
 18 July-31 July: Nobuyuki Aoki
 starting 31 August: Kiyoshi Ueda 
Shiga Prefecture: Yoshitsugu Kunimatsu 
Shiname Prefecture: Nobuyoshi Sumita 
Shizuoka Prefecture: Yoshinobu Ishikawa 
Tochigi Prefecture: Akio Fukuda
Tokushima Prefecture: Tadashi Ōta (until 30 March); Kamon Iizumi (starting 18 May)
Tokyo: Shintarō Ishihara 
Tottori Prefecture: Yoshihiro Katayama 
Toyama Prefecture: Yutaka Nakaoki
Wakayama Prefecture: Yoshiki Kimura 
Yamagata Prefecture: Kazuo Takahashi 
Yamaguchi Prefecture: Sekinari Nii 
Yamanashi Prefecture: Ken Amano (until 2 February); Takahiko Yamamoto (starting 2 February)

Events

January
January: Toyota launches all-new Avensis to be built in Britain.
January 14: Koizumi visits the Yasukuni Shrine.
January 27: All Nippon Airways Flight 908 overshoots the runway at Narita International Airport.
January 29: Asashōryū Akinori becomes the first Mongol to reach the rank of yokozuna in sumo wrestling.

March
March 19: Extension of the Eidan Hanzomon Line from Suitengumae to Oshiage becomes operational.
March 31: Agriculture Minister Tadamori Oshima resigns due to a farm subsidy scandal; Koizumi replaces him with Yoshiyuki Kamei.

April
April 1
The Postal Agency becomes Japan Post, a public corporation.
Saitama becomes a city designated by government ordinance.
Square Co., Ltd. and Enix Corporation merge to become Square Enix.
April 11: An explosion at a fireworks factory in Kagoshima kills 10.
April 15: Tokyo Disneyland celebrates its 20th anniversary.
April 25: Grand opening of Roppongi Hills.

May
May 9: The unmanned spacecraft Hayabusa is launched from Uchinoura Space Center.

July
July 7: Noto Airport opens.
July 26: Diet of Japan authorizes the deployment of Japanese troops to Iraq.

August
August 10: Okinawa Urban Monorail opens.

September
September 20: Koizumi announces a new cabinet: Taro Aso becomes Minister of Internal Affairs, Shoichi Nakagawa becomes Minister of Economy, Trade and Industry, Sadakazu Tanigaki becomes Minister of Finance and Yuriko Koike becomes Minister of Environment.
September 23: Nissan begins production at a plant in Canton, Mississippi, United States.
September 26
 The Liberal Party merges into the Democratic Party of Japan.
 2003 Tokachi earthquake, a Richter magnitude scale 8.3 earthquake, following Richter magnitude scale 7.4 aftershock hit off south eastern Hokkaido, according to Japan Fire and Disaster and Management Agency official confirmed report, two persons lives with 849 person were wounded.

October
October 1: Shinagawa Station opens platforms for the Tōkaidō Shinkansen.
October 10
House of Representatives is dissolved.
The last wild crested ibis in Japan dies.

November
November 9: In the 2003 general election, the Democratic Party of Japan realizes a slight gain against the ruling Liberal Democratic Party.

Births
November 1: Kanon Kasuga, actress

Deaths
January 12: Kinji Fukasaku, film director
February 28: Yō Inoue, voice actress
March 25: Masato Furuoya, actor
April 7: Masato Yamanouchi, voice actor
April 8: Maki Ishii, composer
April 17: Koji Kondo, football player
April 20: Daijiro Kato, motorcycle racer
May 1: Kenji Yoshida, animation film director and film producer
July 8: Etsuko Inada, figure skater
September 5: Yūji Aoki, manga artist
October 11: Sadateru Arikawa, aikido teacher
October 23: Hiroshi Yoshimura, musician
November 1: Toshitaka Shimizu, voice actor
November 13: Mitoyo Kawate, oldest person in the world
December 26: Yoshio Shirai, boxer
Undated: Masahiro Yoshimura, swimmer

See also
 2003 in Japanese television
 List of Japanese films of 2003

References

 
Years of the 21st century in Japan
Japan
Japan